Ram Shastra is a 1995 Indian Bollywood action film directed by Sanjay Gupta. The cast of the movie includes Jackie Shroff, Aditya Pancholi, Manisha Koirala and Deepti Bhatnagar in the lead roles.

The film's theme is inspired from the 1990 American film Hard To Kill and had earlier been remade in 1994 as Cheetah.

Story
Dhonga, a wealthy criminal, plans on assassinating the Police Commissioner (Dara Singh), but his attack is foiled with his younger brother being killed by Ram Sinha (Jackie Shroff), an unemployed individual. Dhonga goes to prison for five years and swears to avenge the humiliation and murder of his brother.  Ram Sinha becomes an inspector, joining fellow inspector Kavi (Aditya Pancholi) in imprisoning various drug dealers and pimps, including those who work for Dhonga. While Ram marries Kavi's sister Anjali and fathers a son, Dhonga returns from prison and plots to legally run his criminal empire with the help of some cops and his lawyer Srivastav (Alok Nath), aiming to get the respect of the Police Commissioner. Dhonga's other brother Satpal (Mukesh Rishi) hatches a plot to murder Anjali, and plants heroin and cocaine in his house, so that Ram gets arrested. Ram escapes his arrest with the help of Ritu, proves his innocence to the Commissioner, and kills all his enemies while rescuing his son and Kavi, who both were kidnapped by Dhonga.

Cast 
 Jackie Shroff as Inspector Ram Sinha
 Aditya Pancholi as Inspector Kavi
 Manisha Koirala as Anjali Sinha Face Surgery   
 Deepti Bhatnagar as Nitu Sinha 
 Anupam Kher as Dhonga the great
 Mukesh Rishi as Satpal Dhonga 
 Johnny Lever as Raja
 Alok Nath as Lawyer Srivastava
 Dinesh Anand as Salim Langda (Drug Dealer)
 Bharat Kapoor as Lawyer
 Sudhir as Inspector Azhgar Ali
 Tiku Talsania as Havaldar
 Ishrat Ali as Inspector Shinde
 Dara Singh as Police Commissioner

Soundtrack
The music was composed by Anu Malik and released by Tips Music. The background score was composed by Aadesh Shrivastava.

References

External links 
 

1995 films
1990s Hindi-language films
Films scored by Anu Malik
Indian remakes of American films
Indian vigilante films
Indian action films
Films directed by Sanjay Gupta
1995 action films
1990s vigilante films
Hindi-language action films